Mustafa Muftak Tahir Tajouri is the Ambassador Extraordinary and Plenipotentiary of the Great Socialist People's Libyan Arab Jamahiriya to the Russian Federation.

Tajouri graduated from the Military College of the Great Jamahiriya in 1982, from which he pursued a career in the Libyan military. After reaching the rank of colonel, he took on teaching roles at a variety of Libyan military educational institutions.

In January 2007, Tajouri was posted as the new Ambassador of Libya to the Russian Federation, and he presented his credentials to Vladimir Putin on 13 April 2007.

See also 
 Embassy of Libya in Moscow
 Libya–Russia relations

References 

Year of birth missing (living people)
Living people
Ambassadors of Libya to Russia